In Brazil, the FM extended band, abbreviated eFM, refers to the extension of the FM broadcast band between 76.1 and 87.3 MHz, beyond the conventional band of 87.5 to 108 MHz that was previously used. The reclaimed spectrum was previously used to broadcast television channels 5 and 6 before the country's digital television transition. The first eFM stations began broadcasting on May 7, 2021, and the spectrum is being used as part of a plan to migrate AM stations to the FM band.

History
The idea of converting the former channels 5 and 6 for sound broadcasting use had been first floated in Brazil in 2013, as a method to support AM stations by migrating them to FM; that year, President Dilma Rousseff signed a law that started the AM–FM migration process in Brazil. Since then, 1,720 of the country's 1,781 AM outlets have requested migration, including in areas where no further FM stations could be added. Jovem Pan News in São Paulo was allowed by the Ministry of Communications to conduct tests on 84.7 MHz in 2014.

In 2017, a decree was issued that required all new radios produced in the Free Economic Zone of Manaus beginning on January 1, 2019, to support tuning the extended band. By 2019, some makers of new automobiles, including Ford and Hyundai, and stereo manufacturer Pioneer Corporation were producing radios that supported the new band. Necessary regulatory changes by the National Telecommunications Agency (ANATEL) came into effect on November 3, 2020.

The new frequencies will support AM–FM migration in parts of Brazil where there is insufficient room to migrate stations on the standard band alone, which is the case in 14 states. However, they will not be accessible on all radio receivers, including smartphones, if these cannot be updated or replaced.

On May 7, 2021, the first ten stations began broadcasting on the extended band. Five, all on 87.1 MHz, are owned by the public broadcaster Brazil Communication Company (EBC). Four of those five are being used to rebroadcast Rádio Nacional's AM service, while the fifth has been designated to Rádio MEC in Brasilia, which already had Rádio Nacional AM on the FM band. The other five stations are existing AM stations.

It is planned that future highway advisory radio services use an eFM channel; only one such service exists in Brazil, .

References

Radio in Brazil
Bandplans
Broadcast engineering
2013 establishments in Brazil
2019 establishments in Brazil
2021 establishments in Brazil